Onchidoris slavi is a species of sea slug, a dorid nudibranch, a shell-less marine gastropod mollusc in the family Onchidorididae.

Distribution
This species was described from Starichkov Island, Kamchatka Peninsula on the Pacific Ocean coast of Russia.

References

Onchidorididae
Gastropods described in 2009